Izabela Płaneta-Małecka (8 December 1930 - 17 December 2016) was a Polish physician, university professor and pediatr who served as the Minister of Health in the Polish People's Republic.

Biography
Daughter of Jan and Zofia, she was born in Lwów (then part of the Second Polish Republic). In 1954 she graduated from the Medical Academy of Łódź. From 1979 she was a professor of medical sciences, and from 1985, professor at the Military Medical Academy. Author of over 600 works in the field of paediatrics. In 1980, she became the head of the 2nd Clinic of Lung Diseases of the Military Medical Academy, established on the basis of the Hospital of Lung Diseases in Łódź. She was the creator and implementer of the concept of multifocal care for a chronically ill child (hospital - clinic - health camp). As part of this activity, for over 20 years she co-organized health camps with for diabetology and gastrology treatment. She was also a co-organizer of two sanatoriums for children with diabetes, in Rabka and Kołobrzeg. In 1983, she became a member of the National Council of the Patriotic Movement for National Rebirth. From October 14, 1988, to August 1, 1989, she was the Minister of Health and Social Welfare in the government of Mieczysław Rakowski. On December 22, 1988, she signed an order formally establishing the University Children Clinical Hospital in Białystok. She worked at the "Polish Mother's Memorial Health Institute" in Łódź as a consultant at the Gastroenterology Clinic and a member of the Scientific Council of the institute. She died in 2016 in Lodz and was buried at the Radogoszcz in the city.

See also
Alina Margolis-Edelman

References

1930 births
2016 deaths
People in health professions from Łódź
Polish women physicians
Polish pediatricians

pl:Izabela Płaneta-Małecka